Panos Paparrigopoulos (Greek: Πάνος Παπαρρηγόπουλος, 1913 – 1985) was a Greek poet and writer. He was born in Filia in southern Achaia, now a prefecture. He studied law and later entered the police in which he was promoted to the rank of Police Director.  He worked with many periodicals and newspapers.

Works

Poetry books

Others

References

External links
Writings in "Nea Estia"
Filia
Eleftheriskepsis.gr

1913 births
1985 deaths
Greek male poets
Poets from Achaea
20th-century Greek poets
20th-century Greek male writers
People from Kleitoria